Icterine  is a colour, described as yellowish, jaundice-yellow or marked with yellow.  It is derived from Ancient Greek ikteros (jaundice), via the Latin ictericus.  It is used as an adjective in the names of birds with yellowish plumage to describe their appearance, including the icterine warbler and icterine greenbul.

See also
 Icterid
 List of colours

References

Shades of yellow
Bird colours

External Links